The Credit (Repossession) Act 1997 was an act regulates repossessions in New Zealand. This Act replaced the limited repossession sections in the Hire Purchase Act 1971. The Act outlined the rights of the debtor, the steps required for repossession, the creditors right of entry, as well as steps the creditor must take once they have repossessed goods. When the Act was passed, it gave protection to all goods subject to a hire purchase agreement, but it was amended in 1999 to limit its protection to only the purchase of consumer goods. It was repealed by the Credit Contracts and Consumer Finance Amendment Act 2014.

Steps required for repossession 

Part 2 of the Act details what steps a creditor must first do before they can lawfully repossess goods, with the main criterion is that the debtor must be in default under the security agreement normally for non payment).

If the debtor is in default, the creditor must then give Notice to the debtor of the default, which is in the form of what is called a Pre Possession Notice.

And finally, the creditor must allow the debtor time to remedy the default, which can not be a period of less than 15 days from the date the Pre Possession Notice was served on the debtor.

If the creditor breaches any of these rules, they risk a fine of up to $3,000.

Creditors Right of Entry 

When a creditor repossesses goods, they must not enter the debtor's residence in an unreasonable manner, nor can they enter residential premises at a prohibited time, which is outside the hours of 6am to 9pm, and at any time on a Sunday or a public holiday.

Also the Act disqualifies certain convicted criminals from acting as repossession agent s, such as anyone convicted of a violent or dishonesty offence in the previous 5 years, anyone released from prison within the previous 12 months, and all people sentences to jail terms of 10 years or more

On the other side of the coin, if someone wilfully and forcibly (i.e. needs to actually use physical force against the repossession agent) obstructs the legal repossession of goods risks a conviction and a fine of up to $10,000.

Steps the creditor must take once they have repossessed goods 

Once goods have been repossessed, the creditor must issue a Post Possession Notice, in the form prescribed in Schedule 2 of the Act, and must be served on the debtor within 21 days of the repossession. Failure to do so means that the creditor is not allowed to recover the costs of repossession from the debtor.

Once the goods are repossessed, the debtor has 15 days from the date the Post Possession Notice was served to either reinstate the security agreement, settle the security agreement in full, or introduce a buyer for a price no less than the valuation on the Post Possession Notice.

After this period the creditor can sell the goods, unless the goods a perishable where the creditor can sell the goods straight away, otherwise the creditor cannot claim any repossession shortfall from the debtor.

The creditor must use all reasonable efforts to obtain the best price for the sale of the repossessed goods, and if the goods are being sold by either public auction or public tender, the creditor must give the debtor reasonable notice of the time and place of the proposed auction, plus any reserve price that may have been set.

Within 10 days following the sale of the goods, the creditor must give the debtor a statement of account (often referred to as an Account After Sale) to the debtor outlining any shortfall and how it this amount is calculated.

This creditor can not legally recover any more from the debtor than this shortfall amount, which would prevent the creditor from adding other fees such as debt collection fees, legal fees, etc.

Other Repossession Law 

Unfortunately the Act does not incorporate all of the repossession law, with the main other law being that a creditor can not repossess goods that have been sold to a third party which were either sold by a Dealer or goods that are worth less than $2,000 when the security agreement was originally entered into.

References

External links 
 Link to Credit (Repossession) Act [1997]

Statutes of New Zealand
1997 in New Zealand law
Debt collection
Repealed New Zealand legislation